The IMOCA 60 Class yacht Safran 2, FRA 25 was designed by Lauriot-Prévost and G. Verdier and launched in the August 2007 after being built Chantier Naval de Laros in France.

Racing Results

References 

Individual sailing yachts
2010s sailing yachts
Sailboat type designs by Guillaume Verdier
Sailing yachts designed by VPLP
Vendée Globe boats
IMOCA 60